Qyaq also spelt Qeyaq is a valley in Afghanistan located in the Jaghatū District of Ghazni province, in the central part of the country.

See also 
 Jaghatū District
 Ghazni Province

Notes 

Jaghatū District
Populated places in Ghazni Province
Ghazni Province
Hazarajat